Harika Veludurthi (born 11 September 1998) is an Indian badminton player.

Achievements

BWF International Challenge/Series 
Women's doubles

Mixed doubles

  BWF International Challenge tournament
  BWF International Series tournament
  BWF Future Series tournament

References

External links
 

Racket sportspeople from Andhra Pradesh
Living people
1998 births
Indian female badminton players
Sportswomen from Andhra Pradesh